McHenry County is a county located in the U.S. state of Illinois. According to the 2020 Census, it had a population of 310,229, making it the sixth-most populous county in Illinois. Its county seat is Woodstock. McHenry County is one of the five collar counties of the Chicago-Naperville-Elgin, IL-IN-WI Metropolitan Statistical Area. Long known as a center of recreation along with agriculture in the western portion, it has more recently experienced rapid rates of suburbanization, exurbanization and urbanization, but the western portions of the county remain primarily agricultural and rural.

History
McHenry County was formed in 1836 out of Cook and LaSalle counties. The county was named for Major William McHenry, a member of the Illinois Militia during Tecumseh's War, a major during the Blackhawk War in 1832, and a member of the Illinois House of Representatives and Senate. He died in Vandalia in 1835.

McHenry County originally stretched all the way east to Lake Michigan, with the county seat centrally in McHenry, but in 1839, the eastern townships of the county were carved out to form Lake County.

Historical sites

 The Count's House, 3803 Waukegan Rd, McHenry
 Charles H. Hibbard House, 413 W Grant Hwy, Marengo
 Col. Gustavus A. Palmer House, 5516 Terra Cotta Rd., Crystal Lake
 Orson Rogers House, 19621 E Grant Hwy, Marengo
 Lucein Boneparte Covell House, 5805 Broadway, Richmond
 Memorial Hall, 10308 Main St, Richmond
 Old McHenry County Courthouse, Woodstock City Square, Woodstock
 Woodstock Opera House, 110 Van Buren St, Woodstock
 Woodstock Square Historic District, Woodstock
 George Stickney House, 1904 Cherry Valley Rd, Bull Valley
 Terwilliger House, Mason Hill Rd & Cherry Valley Rd, Bull Valley

Geography

Adjacent counties
 Walworth County, Wisconsin - north
 Kenosha County, Wisconsin - northeast
 Lake County - east
 Cook County - southeast
 Kane County - south
 DeKalb County - southwest
 Boone County - west

Climate and weather

McHenry County is like much of the Upper Midwest, as it usually sees hot, humid summers, and cold, snowy winters. The county is notably susceptible to high wind events, blizzards, severe thunderstorms, tornadoes, and flooding.

Some of the most notable weather events in the county include the 1965 Palm Sunday tornado outbreak, the Blizzard of 1967, the 1967 Belvidere - Oak Lawn tornado outbreak, the Blizzard of 1979, the Flood of 1996, the Blizzard of 1999, the Early Winter 2006 North American Storm Complex, the 2007 Midwest flooding event, the January 2008 tornado outbreak sequence, and the Blizzard of 2011.

Demographics

As of the 2010 census, there were 308,760 people, 109,199 households, and 82,288 families residing in the county. The racial makeup of the county was 90.1% white, 2.5% Asian, 1.1% black or African American, 0.3% American Indian, 4.3% from other races, and 1.7% from two or more races. Those of Hispanic or Latino origin made up 11.4% of the population. In terms of ancestry, 34.4% were of German heritage, 18.7% were of Irish ancestry, 14.2% Polish, 10.8% Italian, 7.8% English, and 3.7% of American heritage.

Of the 109,199 households, 40.1% had children under the age of 18 living with them, 62.3% were married couples living together, 8.9% had a female householder with no husband present, 24.6% were non-families, and 19.8% of all households were made up of individuals. The average household size was 2.81 and the average family size was 3.25. The median age was 38.0 years.

The median income for a household in the county was $76,482 and the median income for a family was $86,698. Males had a median income of $61,971 versus $42,125 for females. The per capita income for the county was $31,838. About 4.9% of families and 6.2% of the population were below the poverty line, including 8.3% of those under age 18 and 4.6% of those age 65 or over.

Communities

Cities
 Crystal Lake
 Harvard
 Marengo
 McHenry
 Woodstock (county seat)

Villages

 Algonquin (mostly)
 Barrington Hills (part)
 Bull Valley
 Cary
 Fox Lake (part)
 Fox River Grove (part)
 Greenwood
 Hebron
 Holiday Hills
 Huntley (part)
 Island Lake (part)
 Johnsburg
 Lake in the Hills
 Lakemoor (part)
 Lakewood
 McCullom Lake
 Oakwood Hills
 Port Barrington (part)
 Prairie Grove
 Richmond
 Ringwood
 Spring Grove
 Trout Valley
 Union
 Wonder Lake

Census-designated places

 Alden
 Big Foot Prairie
 Burtons Bridge
 Chemung
 Coral
 Franklinville
 Harmony
 Hartland
 Lawrence
 Pistakee Highlands
 Ridgefield
 Riley
 Solon Mills
Before the 2020 Census, only Chemung and Pistakee Highlands were CDPs.

Unincorporated communities

 Belden
 Palm Beach (part)
 Silver Lake
 Terra Cotta

Townships

 Alden
 Algonquin
 Burton
 Chemung
 Coral
 Dorr
 Dunham
 Grafton
 Greenwood
 Hartland
 Hebron
 Marengo
 McHenry
 Nunda
 Richmond
 Riley
 Seneca

Government
McHenry County government is based primarily out of Woodstock, the county seat. The McHenry County Government Center, located on the north end of Woodstock along Illinois Route 47, features county offices as well as judicial facilities.

The current Sheriff of McHenry County, Illinois is Bill Prim, who was first elected in 2014.

Politics
As a primarily outer suburban and exurban area, McHenry County has voted for the Republican candidate for President in all but two elections since 1880, the first being when “Bull Moose” candidate and former Republican president Theodore Roosevelt won the county in 1912. Recent elections in 2004 and 2000 saw George W. Bush capture 59.72% and 58.5% of the county vote, respectively. In 2008, Democrat Barack Obama, then a Senator from Illinois, captured McHenry County with 52% of the vote—the first time a Democrat had carried the county since 1852. In the 2012 presidential election, Obama only received 44% of the vote whereas Republican Mitt Romney captured 53% of the vote. In the 2016 presidential election, Republican Donald Trump received 50% of the vote whereas Democratic Hillary Clinton received 42% of the vote.

No person with significant ties to McHenry County has ever been elected to the United States Congress or Illinois governorship. The mother of U.S. President Gerald Ford, Dorothy Ayer Gardner, was born in Harvard in 1892.

Education
McHenry County College, a growing community college established in 1967, serves the majority of county residents. The college includes 2,000 full-time students and 5,800 part-time students. The main campus is located on the northwest side of Crystal Lake, along U.S. Route 14. Secondary facilities exist in Crystal Lake and McHenry.

McHenry County also includes dozens of school districts. This is a list of high schools that can be found in the county:

Students in McHenry County may also be zoned into schools in other counties, such as Dundee-Crown High School in neighboring Carpentersville.

Medical facilities
Hospitals currently in the county include Mercy Harvard Hospital, Centegra Northern Illinois Medical Center in McHenry, Centegra Memorial Medical Center in Woodstock, and Centegra's Northwestern Medicine Huntley Hospital. Amita (formerly Presence) and Advocate health systems also maintain a strong influence in the county, and have hospitals in nearby Elgin and Barrington. On September 1, 2018, Centegra was acquired by Northwestern Medicine of Chicago, Illinois. Prior to its acquisition by Northwestern Medicine, Centegra was the largest independent employer in McHenry County. It is now part of a network of more than 10 hospitals and 400 care locations.

Economy
Much of McHenry County's economy centers around manufacturing, metalworking, media development and printing, transportation equipment, agriculture, health care, education, retail, food production, distribution, and technology. Gravel mining makes up a sizable portion of the country's economy.

The major employment centers can be found in Crystal Lake, Algonquin, Huntley, McHenry, and Woodstock.

The southern portions of the county are within the scope of the Golden Corridor, the region of commerce along the Jane Addams Memorial Tollway.

Shopping
The county is known for its wide variety of shopping options. McHenry, Crystal Lake, and Algonquin/Lake in the Hills have established themselves as major retail areas, all featuring an array of big box stores, specialty stores, and restaurants. While there are no major malls located within the county, several lie just outside its borders: the lifestyle centers Algonquin Commons and Algonquin Galleria, and the regional indoor mall Spring Hill Mall in West Dundee.

In addition, several historic downtowns throughout the county offer unique shops and eateries in charming environments. The Woodstock Square Historic District, antique shops in Richmond and Hebron, downtown Crystal Lake and downtown Algonquin, and shops in other historic downtowns throughout the county accommodate residents and tourists alike. McHenry's Green Street is also a major attraction in the county.

Recreation

The entire county is served by the McHenry County Conservation District, which preserves sensitive land throughout the county and provides recreational opportunities for residents. The District also operates the McHenry County Prairie Path, a regional bike path that extends from the Wisconsin State Line in Richmond southward to Algonquin, where the path connects with the Fox River Bike Trail, which continues south to Aurora.

In addition, the Fox River, Kishwaukee River and Chain O'Lakes provide immense opportunities for boating, fishing, swimming, and other water activities. Moraine Hills State Park and Chain O' Lakes State Park are both located in the county, adjacent to the waterway. Other major lakes in the county include Crystal Lake, Wonder Lake, and McCullom Lake.

There are also dozens of parks, golf courses, and country clubs throughout the county. Major skiing areas include Nordic Ski Jump in Fox River Grove and Buffalo Snowboarding Park in Algonquin. In addition, the Windy City Balloon Port in Fox River Grove offers hot air balloon rides over the Fox River Valley.

In 2012, the Hackmatack National Wildlife Refuge was established and encompasses parts of McHenry County.

Culture

McHenry County has an active art and theater scene. The historic Woodstock Opera House and Crystal Lake's Raue Center for the Arts both provide exceptional programs. In addition, Algonquin is noted for its Public Art Program, which showcases artwork year-round throughout the community. The county is also ideal for photography and filming. Much of the filming for the 1993 movie Groundhog Day took place in Woodstock.

There are also several important points of interest in the county including the Illinois Railway Museum and McHenry County Historical Museum in Union, the Old McHenry County Courthouse in Woodstock, and a variety of historical homes including the Orson Rogers House, George Stickney House, Charles H. Hibbard House, the Terwilliger House, the Count's House, and the Dole Mansion.

Throughout the year are a variety of festivals throughout the county, the centerpiece of which is the McHenry County Fair, occurring during a week in August in Woodstock. Many towns also have their own festivals throughout the year. Some of the most notable ones are the Ground Hog Days and the Great Lake Steelpan Festival in Woodstock, Fall Fest in Huntley, the Summer Sunset Festival in Lake in the Hills, the Lakeside Festival in Crystal Lake, Milk Days in Harvard, Settler's Days in Marengo, Cary Days in Cary, Founders Days in Algonquin, and Fiesta Days in McHenry.

Transportation

Major highways

  Interstate 90
  U.S. Highway 12
  U.S. Highway 14
  U.S. Highway 20
  Illinois Route 22
  Illinois Route 23
  Illinois Route 31
  Illinois Route 47
  Illinois Route 62
  Illinois Route 120
  Illinois Route 173
  Illinois Route 176
 Lake Cook Road
 Randall Road

Several Federal and state highways run through McHenry County, including U.S. Highway 20, U.S. Highway 14, U.S. Highway 12, Illinois Route 22, Illinois Route 23, Illinois Route 173, Illinois Route 120, Illinois Route 176, Illinois Route 47, Illinois Route 31, and Illinois Route 62. Highly traveled county highways include Randall Road, Algonquin Road, Rakow Road, and Walkup Road.

McHenry County was the most populous county in the United States without direct access to an Interstate Highway within its borders. As a result, residents usually used the nearby Interstate 90 (the Jane Addams Memorial Tollway), via interchanges in neighboring Kane County. But a new interchange is now completed at I-90 and Illinois Route 23, which provides McHenry County with direct access to the interstate highway system.

Interstate 94 lies to the east of McHenry County in Lake County, Illinois.

Mass transportation
McHenry County is served by Metra Rail, which provides daily commuter service to and from downtown Chicago. There are seven stations in the county, all of them located along the Union Pacific Northwest Line. The county is also served by Pace, which provides five fixed bus routes (550, 806, 807, 808, and 809), and MCRide Dial-A-Ride transit service operated by Pace and First Transit.

Airports
Lake in the Hills Airport offers general aviation service, as do Dacy Airport and Galt Airport, in the northern part of the county.

Media
McHenry County is entirely within the scope of the Chicago media market and the majority of the county relies primarily on Chicago television stations, radio stations, and newspapers for the source of its news and information. Certain sections of the county, particularly the rural far northern and far western parts, are also within the scope of the Milwaukee and Rockford media markets, respectively.

The county has an FM radio station, WZSR (Star 105.5 FM), which plays mostly adult contemporary and pop music. WZSR is based out of Crystal Lake.

The Northwest Herald, with a circulation of approximately 21,000, is the county's primary newspaper, serving the greater McHenry County area, and printed and published in Crystal Lake.

Lake and McHenry County Scanner, launched in 2012 by Sam Borcia, is a local digital newspaper which covers McHenry County and nearby Lake County, Illinois.

The county is also served by the larger Chicago newspapers Chicago Tribune, Chicago Sun-Times, and the suburban-focused newspaper The Daily Herald.

McHenry County Living, a bimonthly lifestyle magazine serving the county, reaches tens of thousands of area residents and businesses.

See also
 National Register of Historic Places listings in McHenry County, Illinois

References
Specific

General

Further reading
 Dupré, D.H. and D.M. Robertson. (2004). Water quality of Nippersink Creek and Wonder Lake, McHenry County, Illinois, 1994-2001 [Scientific Investigations Report 2004-5085]. Reston, VA: U.S. Department of the Interior, U.S. Geological Survey.

External links

 McHenry County official website
 Major William McHenry
 McHenry County Historical Society
 History of McHenry County Townships
 United Way of McHenry County
 McHenry County Conservation District
 McHenry County at The Crittenden Automotive Library
 The Land Conservancy of McHenry County
 McHenry County College
 McHenry County Local
 McHenry County Conservation District

 
1836 establishments in Illinois
McHenry County
Illinois counties
Populated places established in 1836